Englund is a surname of Swedish origin, meaning "meadow grove" (from Swedish äng, meadow, and lund, grove).

Geographical distribution
As of 2014, 57.0% of all known bearers of the surname Englund were residents of Sweden (frequency 1:1,255), 31.0% of the United States (1:84,563), 4.5% of Finland (1:8,866), 2.0% of Norway (1:18,431) and 1.6% of Denmark (1:24,976).

In Sweden, the frequency of the surname was higher than national average (1:1,255) in the following counties:
 1. Gävleborg County (1:402)
 2. Västernorrland County (1:501)
 3. Uppsala County (1:675)
 4. Norrbotten County (1:707)
 5. Värmland County (1:721)
 6. Jämtland County (1:768)
 7. Dalarna County (1:835)
 8. Västmanland County (1:917)
 9. Västerbotten County (1:1,066)
 10. Örebro County (1:1,093)
 11. Södermanland County (1:1,214)
 12. Stockholm County (1:1,251)

In Finland, the frequency of the surname was higher than national average (1:8,866) in the following regions:
 1. Åland (1:305)
 2. Ostrobothnia (1:1,207)
 3. Uusimaa (1:6,061)
 4. Tavastia Proper (1:7,267)

People
Anabel Englund (born 1992), American singer songwriter
David Englund (born 1962), American designer
Einar Englund (1916–1999), Finnish composer
Gene Englund (1917–1995), American basketball player
John Englund (1873–1948), American politician and newspaper editor
Lars-Erik Englund (1934–2010), Swedish Air Force Lieutenant General
Nils-Joel Englund (1907–1995), Swedish cross-country skier
Ola Englund (born 1981), Swedish guitar player, record producer, YouTuber, and owner of Solar Guitars
Olov Englund (born 1983), Swedish Bandy player
Patric Englund (born 1970), Swedish ice hockey player
Peter Englund (born 1957), Swedish author
Robert Englund (born 1947), American actor
Robert Keith Englund (1952–2020), American archaeologist
Tom S. Englund (born 1973), Swedish guitar player and singer of Evergrey
Will Englund (born 1953), American editorial writer and associate editor

See also
Englund, Minnesota, an unincorporated community, United States
Englund Gambit, chess opening
England (surname)

References

Swedish-language surnames